Nebraska Highway 57 (N-57) is a highway in northeastern Nebraska, United States. The southern segment begins northeast of Leigh at N-91 and ends at U.S. Highway 275 north of Stanton. The northern segment begins south of Carroll at N-98 and ends north of Hartington at an intersection with N-12.

Route description

Southern segment
The southern segment of N-57 begins northeast of Leigh at N-91.  It goes north through farmland and meets N-32 before entering Stanton.  While in Stanton, it intersects N-24.  It continues north from Stanton and ends at U.S. 275.

Northern segment
The northern segment of N-57 begins south of Carroll at N-98, one mile (1.6 km) west of N-98's intersection with N-35.  It goes north into farmland, through Carroll, and meets U.S. Highway 20 east of Belden.  It turns west with U.S. 20 to enter Belden, then turns north.  Before entering Coleridge, it meets N-59.  It leaves Coleridge going northwest, then turns north again before meeting N-84.  N-57 and N-84 run concurrent through Hartington, where N-84 separates.  N-57 continues straight north out of Hartington and ends at an intersection with N-12.

History
Prior to November 2001, the current segment of N-57 north of its present junction with N-59 was a part of N-15.  The old route for N-57 went east from its current intersection with Highway 59, then turned north at what is now the intersection of U.S. 20, N-59 and N-15 north of Laurel.  The highway then went north and ended at N-12.  In November 2001, the routes for Highway 57 and Highway 15 were swapped so N-15 could align with the Vermillion-Newcastle Bridge, which opened that month.  The east–west segment which carried both of those highways then became Highway 59.

Major intersections

References

External links

Nebraska Roads: NE 41-60

057
Transportation in Colfax County, Nebraska
Transportation in Stanton County, Nebraska
Transportation in Wayne County, Georgia
Transportation in Cedar County, Nebraska